Bazetta Township is one of the twenty-four townships of Trumbull County, Ohio, United States.  The 2000 census found 6,306 people in the township.

Geography
Located at the center of the county, it borders the following townships:
Mecca Township - north
Johnston Township - northeast corner
Fowler Township - east
Vienna Township - southeast corner
Howland Township - south
Warren Township - southwest corner
Champion Township - west
Bristol Township - northwest corner

Most of the city of Cortland is located in northeastern Bazetta Township.

Name and history
The etymology of the name Bazetta is uncertain. It is the only Bazetta Township statewide.
Famous inhabitants include Gabby and Jaycob Whitmore

Government
The township is governed by a three-member board of trustees, who are elected in November of odd-numbered years to a four-year term beginning on the following January 1. Two are elected in the year after the presidential election and one is elected in the year before it. There is also an elected township fiscal officer, who serves a four-year term beginning on April 1 of the year after the election, which is held in November of the year before the presidential election. Vacancies in the fiscal officership or on the board of trustees are filled by the remaining trustees.

References

External links
Official Bazetta Township Website

Townships in Trumbull County, Ohio
Townships in Ohio